"Castles in the Sand" is a song by Canadian pop rock group The Philosopher Kings. Released in 2005 as the lead single from their fourth studio album, Castles, it reached the top 10 on both the adult contemporary and hot adult contemporary charts in Canada. It was the first single released by the group in over five years since their 2000 single, "If I Ever Lose This Heaven".

Charts

References

2005 songs
Canadian pop songs